Alepisaurus paronai is an extinct species of lancetfish known from a fossil skull found in Middle Miocene-aged strata in Piedmont, Italy. The skull is very similar in anatomy and dimensions to that of the extant long-snouted lancetfish. The specific name honors one Professor Carlo Fabrizio Parona, a friend and personal mentor of its describer, Geremia d'Erasmo.

See also

Other notable extinct Cenozoic aulopiforms include:
Argillichthys, a synodontid lizardfish from the Ypresian London Clay
Polymerichthys, a closely related alepisauroid from Middle Miocene Japan

References

Prehistoric aulopiformes
Miocene fishes of Europe
Alepisauridae